The Rootstown Local School District is a secondary school district located in Rootstown, Ohio, United States.  The district serves approximately 1,300 students in Rootstown Township in Portage County and has three schools: Rootstown Elementary School serving grades K-5, Rootstown Middle School serving grades 6–8, and Rootstown High School serving grades 9-12.  All three schools are located on a central campus along SR 44 between I-76 and Tallmadge Road, just north of the Rootstown town center.  Each building is named in honor of a past prominent member of the Rootstown Schools.  
Additionally, Rootstown Schools participate in the post-secondary program allowing high school students to take college courses while still in high school, and are part of the Maplewood Joint Vocational School in Ravenna with several other Portage County districts.  The Rootstown Local School District was rated "excellent" by the Ohio State Board of Education in 2006, the board's highest rating for school districts.

Rootstown Elementary School

Rootstown Elementary School, named in honor of Bertha Bradshaw, opened in 1958. Additional classrooms were added in 1959 and 1961, and the cafeteria was opened in 1966.  The school serves over 550 students in grades K-5.

Rootstown Middle School

Roostown Middle School is housed in the original Rootstown Township School, which opened in 1917.  The building, named in honor of Mabel Schnee, is located on the south end of the campus and served as the home of all grades until the opening of the neighboring elementary school in 1958 and served as the high school until the current high school opened in 1966. Several additions have been made to the building over the years including: a gymnasium and additional classrooms in 1939; An industrial arts classroom along with more classrooms in 1950; as well as additions in 1954 and 1977.  In 1998, a bell tower was constructed adjacent to the middle school and dedicated in honor of Dorothy Dundon.  The Board of Education had originally purchased the bell in 1884 for about $60 and restored it when the bell tower was constructed. 
In 2004, a sixth grade team from Rootstown Middle School took first place at the International Bowl competition for the Future Problem Solving program in the Junior Division (grades 4–6).

Rootstown High School

The current Rootstown High School building, named in honor of Ward W. Davis, opened in 1966.

Notable students
Brian McClure (Class of 1982), professional football player in the National Football League (NFL).

External links

 Rootstown Local School District

Education in Portage County, Ohio
School districts in Ohio